μ Librae (Latinised as Mu Librae) is the Bayer designation for a probable triple star system in the zodiac constellation of Libra. They have a combined apparent visual magnitude of 5.32, which is bright enough to be faintly visible to the naked eye. With an annual parallax shift of 13.71 mas, the system is located at an estimated distance of around 240 light years.

The inner pair consists of two A-type stars that, as of 2006, had an angular separation of 1.79 arc seconds along a position angle of 5.5°. They have an estimated physical separation of 139 AU. The primary, component A, is a visual magnitude 5.69 magnetic Ap star showing overabundances of the elements aluminum, strontium, chromium, and europium. Hence, it has a stellar classification of A1pSrEuCr. The surface magnetic field strength is 1,375 Gauss.

The secondary, component B, is an Am star with a stellar classification of A6m. It has a visual magnitude of 6.72. The tertiary member, component C, is a magnitude 14.70 star at an angular separation of 12.90 arc seconds along a position angle of 294°, as of 2000.

References

A-type main-sequence stars
Am stars
Libra (constellation)
Libra, Mu
BD-13 3986
130559
072489
5523
Ap stars